The molecular formula C16H24N2O4 (molar mass: 308.37 g/mol) may refer to:

 Diacetolol
 Hydroxycarteolol
 Nitracaine
 Ubenimex, or bestatin

Molecular formulas